The Little Foxes is a 1941 American drama film directed by William Wyler. The screenplay by Lillian Hellman is based on her 1939 play The Little Foxes. Hellman's ex-husband Arthur Kober, Dorothy Parker and her husband Alan Campbell contributed additional scenes and dialogue.

Plot
In 1900, in the cotton country of the deep South, beautiful and brilliant Regina Hubbard Giddens struggles for wealth and freedom within the confines of an early 20th-century society where fathers only considered sons as legal heirs. As a result, thanks to their ruthless tradesman father, her avaricious brothers, Benjamin and Oscar, are independently wealthy, while she is financially dependent upon her sickly husband, Horace, whose severe heart condition has confined him to a sanitarium in Baltimore for several years.

When the film begins, the Hubbards are expecting a dinner guest, William Marshall, a prominent businessman from Chicago. Ben and Oscar persuade him to build a cotton mill in their town, making them multimillionaires. Marshall invites Regina to visit him in Chicago. After he leaves, she reveals that she plans to move there, taking her daughter, Alexandra, with her.

Regina proceeds to drive a hard bargain with her brothers for a larger percentage of the mill in exchange for persuading Horace to help finance it, to the tune of $75,000. She sends Alexandra to Baltimore to bring her father home, supposedly because Regina misses him. Regina and Horace's reunion does not go well: She cannot wait to ask him for the money. He has an attack, and still she presses, destroying any illusion that she really wanted him home. Horace tells the three siblings he wants no part of it.

Oscar, having married and abused the sweet-souled, fragile, now-alcoholic Birdie to acquire her family's plantation and its cotton fields, now schemes to consolidate the family wealth by a marriage between his son, Leo, and Alexandra, but neither Horace nor Regina like the idea.

While the two of them argue upstairs, the brothers find an alternative. Leo, a teller at the bank, will “borrow” Horace's railroad bonds from his safe deposit box. They will use them as security for the construction, returning them long before it is time to clip the coupons. Gloating, Ben tells a furious, bewildered Regina they don't need her. Horace overhears. He is glad not to be a part of wrecking the town. Regina's anger is icy cold: “I hope you die soon,” she says. Distraught, Alexandra tells her father not to listen.

After an impromptu trip to the bank, Horace discovers that the bonds are missing. When he tells Regina what happened, she is delighted at having a scandal to hold over her brothers' heads, until Horace tells her he will say he lent the bonds to Leo, on her behalf. He is changing his will, leaving the bonds to Regina and everything else to Alexandra. She admits to Horace she never loved him, and only married him for money, and the bitter, ugly words bring on a heart attack. He spills his medicine, and Regina sits, motionless, as he staggers to the stairs and collapses halfway up. Now Regina rushes to him, calling for the servants to take him to his room and go for Doctor Sloan. Horace dies leaving no one to contradict Regina if she accuses her brothers of theft. She forces them to give her 75% ownership of the business. A bewildered Alexandra overhears this. “What was Poppa doing on the staircase?” Ben accepts the deal philosophically. As they leave, he agrees with Alexandra, “What was Horace doing on the stairs?”

Regina is going to Chicago. Refusing to accompany her, Alexandra recalls their maid, Addie, saying that there are people who eat the earth and people who stand by and watch. She won't watch. Frustrated, Regina tells her daughter that she can not control her. She hopes that Alexandra will stay, but in any case she is going to have the life for which she has yearned all her life. Regina pauses on the stairs, staring at Horace's room, and asks Alexandra if she would like to sleep in her room.  “Why, mama, are you afraid?“

Alexandra's relationship with her childhood friend, journalist David Hewitt, her coming of age under his influence and their growing love arcs throughout the film. Now, she walks away with him, into the rainy night.

Cast

 Bette Davis as Regina Hubbard Giddens
 Herbert Marshall as Horace Giddens
 Teresa Wright as Alexandra "Zannie" Giddens
 Richard Carlson as David Hewitt
 Dan Duryea as Leo Hubbard
 Patricia Collinge as Birdie Hubbard
 Charles Dingle as Ben Hubbard
 Carl Benton Reid as Oscar Hubbard
 Jessica Grayson as Addie (as Jessie Grayson)
 John Marriott as Cal
 Russell Hicks as William Marshall
 Lucien Littlefield as Manders
 Virginia Brissac as Mrs. Hewitt
 Terry Nibert as Julia
 Henry 'Hot Shot' Thomas as Harold
 Charles R. Moore as Simon
 Hooper Atchley as Party Guest (uncredited)
 Al Bridge as Dawson (uncredited)
 Tex Driscoll as Bank Customer (uncredited)
 Jesse Graves as Headwaiter (uncredited)
 Lew Kelly as Train Companion (uncredited)
 Henry Roquemore as Depositor (uncredited)
 Kenny Washington as Servant (uncredited)

Production

The title comes from Chapter 2, Verse 15 in the Song of Solomon in the King James version of the Bible, which reads, "Take us the foxes, the little foxes, that spoil the vines: for our vines have tender grapes." The same passage also inspired the title of an unrelated film, Our Vines Have Tender Grapes.

Tallulah Bankhead had received critical acclaim for her performance in the 1939 Broadway production of Hellman's play, but director William Wyler, who previously had teamed with Bette Davis on Jezebel and The Letter, insisted on casting her in the lead role instead. Producer Samuel Goldwyn agreed, since none of Bankhead's films had been box office hits. (Coincidentally, Davis had recreated on film another of Bankhead's Broadway roles, Judith Traherne in Dark Victory.) However, Davis was reluctant: "On The Little Foxes I begged the producer, Samuel Goldwyn, to let Tallulah Bankhead play Regina because Tallulah was magnificent on the stage. He wouldn't let her." Initially Jack L. Warner refused to lend Davis to Goldwyn, who then offered the role to Miriam Hopkins. When Wyler refused to work with her, Goldwyn resumed negotiations with Warner and finally secured Davis for $385,000. As a contract player at Warner Bros., Davis was earning $3,000 a week, and when she discovered how much Warner had received for her appearance in Foxes, she demanded and ultimately received a share of the payment.

Wyler encouraged Davis to see Bankhead in the original play, which she did despite major misgivings. She later regretted doing so because after watching Bankhead's performance and reading Hellman's screenplay she felt compelled to create a totally different interpretation of the role, one she didn't feel suited the character. Bankhead had portrayed Regina as a victim forced to fight for her survival due to the contempt with which her brothers treated her, but Davis played her as a cold, conniving, calculating woman wearing a death mask of white powder she insisted makeup artist Perc Westmore create for her.

In her autobiography, A Lonely Life, Davis gave a different version about having to see Bankhead in the play. "A great admirer of hers, I wanted in no way to be influenced by her work. It was Willie's intention that I give a different interpretation of the part. I insisted that Tallulah had played it the only way it could be played. Miss Hellman's Regina was written with such definition that it could only be played one way." "I had to do that part exactly the way Tallulah did it, because that's the way Lillian Hellman wrote it. But I was always sad that Tallulah couldn't record Regina from the theatre, because she was marvelous."

Charles Dingle, Carl Benton Reid, Dan Duryea, and Patricia Collinge all reprised their critically acclaimed Broadway performances. Critics preferred Bankhead's rendition of the role to Davis's, though the supporting cast was highly praised. The character of David Hewitt was not in the original play. Hellman created him to add a second sympathetic male to stand alongside Horace among all the venomous Hubbard men.

Davis and Wyler frequently fought during filming, about everything from her appearance (Wyler thought she looked like a Kabuki performer, but Davis wanted to look older than her age as the part was written for a 40-year-old) to the set design (which Davis thought was far too opulent for a family supposedly struggling financially) to her interpretation of the role (Wyler wanted a more feminine and sympathetic Regina, akin to Tallulah's interpretation). Davis had yielded to Wyler's demands during production of The Letter, but this time she held her ground. Not helping the situation was the fact Los Angeles was experiencing its worst heat wave in years, and the temperature on the soundstages regularly rose above 100 degrees. Davis finally walked off the picture. "It was the only time in my career that I walked out on a film after the shooting had begun," she later recalled. "I was a nervous wreck due to the fact that my favorite and most admired director was fighting me every inch of the way ... I just didn't want to continue." The actress retreated to her rented house in Laguna Beach and "flatly refused to come back to work. It took a little courage, to say the least. Goldwyn had it in his power to sue me for the entire cost of the production." A week later she returned to the set after rumors she would be replaced by Katharine Hepburn or Miriam Hopkins began to circulate, although Goldwyn was not about to bear the expense of scrapping all the footage with Davis and refilming the scenes with a new actress. Even though the film was a critical and commercial success and nominated for nine Academy Awards, she and Wyler never worked together again.
The film premiered at Radio City Music Hall in New York City. The New York Times reported it was seen by 22,163 persons on its opening day, setting what was then an all-time attendance mark for a normal opening day at the theatre.

In 1946, Hellman wrote the play Another Part of the Forest, a prequel to Foxes. It was adapted for the screen in 1948.

In 2003, the character of Regina Giddens, played by Davis, was ranked No. 43 on the American Film Institute list of the 50 Best Villains of American Cinema.

Critical reception
In his review in The New York Times, Bosley Crowther observed,

Variety said,

Box office
According to RKO records, The Little Foxes took in $1,317,000 in theater rentals from the United States and Canada and an additional $850,000 from foreign rentals, but because of the favorable terms Sam Goldwyn enjoyed with distributor RKO, RKO recorded a loss of $140,000 on the film.

Awards and nominations

The film received 9 Academy Award nominations and no wins, setting a record later tied by Peyton Place in 1957. The record was surpassed by The Turning Point in 1977, which received 11 nominations without a win; The Color Purple earned the same distinction in 1985.

Radio adaptation
The Little Foxes was presented February 11, 1946, on Screen Guild Theatre. The 30-minute adaptation starred Davis, Wright and Dingle in their roles from the film.  
Tallulah Bankhead (reprising her Broadway role) also gave a radio adaptation.

In popular culture
In 1975, the eighth episode of the ninth season of The Carol Burnett Show featured a spoof of the film called "The Little Foxies", with Carol Burnett as "Virgina Grubber Gibbons", Roddy McDowall as "Morris Gibbons", Harvey Korman as "Bosco Grubber", Vicki Lawrence as "Burly Grubber" and Tim Conway as "Theo Grubber".

References

Bibliography

External links

 
 
 
 
 
 
 The Little Foxes at Reel Classics
 The Little Foxes on Screen Guild Theater: August 6, 1945
 Nighttime exterior of Radio City Music Hall, with marquis indicating that The Little Foxes starring Bette Davis, Herbert Marshall and Teresa Wright, is playing there.

1941 films
1941 drama films
American drama films
American black-and-white films
American films based on plays
Films based on works by Lillian Hellman
Films directed by William Wyler
Films set in Alabama
Films set in the 1900s
Samuel Goldwyn Productions films
Films with screenplays by Lillian Hellman
Films with screenplays by Dorothy Parker
1940s English-language films
1940s American films